Maria Susanna Cummins (April 9, 1827 – October 1, 1866) was an American novelist. She authored the widely popular novel The Lamplighter (1854).

Biography
Maria Susanna Cummins was born in Salem, Massachusetts, on April 9, 1827. She was the daughter of Honorable David Cummins and Maria F. Kittredge, and was the eldest of four children from that marriage. The Cummins family resided in the neighborhood of Dorchester in Boston, Massachusetts. Cummins' father encouraged her to become a writer at an early age. She studied at Mrs. Charles Sedgwick's Young Ladies School in Lenox, Massachusetts.

In 1854, she published the novel The Lamplighter, a sentimental book which was widely popular and which made its author well-known. One reviewer called it "one of the most original and natural narratives". Within eight weeks, it sold 40,000 copies and totaled 70,000 by the end of its first year in print. She wrote other books, including Mabel Vaughan (1857), none of which had the same success.  Cummins also published in some of the popular periodicals of her day.

Cummins died in Dorchester after a period of illness on October 1, 1866, aged 39.

Selected bibliography
 1854 : The Lamplighter
 1857 : Mabel Vaughan
 1860 : El Fureidis
 1864 : A Talk About Guides
 1864 : Haunted Hearts
 1865 : Around Mull

Further reading
Dictionary of Literary Biography. 1978ff. Detroit. Gale Research Company.
Notable American Women: A Biographical Dictionary. 1971. Ed. Edward T. James, Janet Wilson James & Paul S. Boyer. 3 Bde. Cambridge, MA. The Belknap Press of Harvard UP.

References

External links
 Dorchester Atheneum : Maria Susanna Cummins - biography
 
 
 
 The Lamplighter by 
 The Lamplighter by Rebecca Saulsbury at the Literary Encyclopedia
 "The Lamplighter" audio book at "Librivox"

1827 births
1866 deaths
19th-century American novelists
Writers from Salem, Massachusetts
Writers from Boston
American women novelists
19th-century American women writers
Novelists from Massachusetts
People from Dorchester, Massachusetts
Abbot Academy alumni